Robinson Rock House Ruin and Plantation Site, also known as Site 31MK272, is a historic archaeological site located in Reedy Creek Park at Charlotte, Mecklenburg County, North Carolina.  It is the remnants of an 18th-century stone dwelling of the Colonial period.  The Robinson Stone House was probably built between 1780 and 1810.  In September, 1979, the site was acquired by the City of Charlotte to be incorporated into a new park and nature preserve.

It was added to the National Register of Historic Places in 2009.

References

Archaeological sites on the National Register of Historic Places in North Carolina
Colonial architecture in North Carolina
Houses completed in 1810
Houses in Charlotte, North Carolina
National Register of Historic Places in Mecklenburg County, North Carolina
Plantation houses in North Carolina